Seattle Sounders FC is an American professional soccer club based in Seattle, Washington that competes in Major League Soccer (MLS). Sounders FC was established on November 13, 2007, as an MLS expansion team, making it the 15th team in the league. Fans chose the Sounders name through an online poll in 2008, making the Seattle Sounders FC the third Seattle soccer club to share the name.
The list encompasses the major honors won by Seattle Sounders FC, records set by the club, their managers and their players.

Honors 

Seattle Sounders' first trophy was the 2009 U.S. Open Cup, which they won against D.C. United. The club also won the Heritage Cup for the first time the following year against the San Jose Earthquakes.

National competitions 
MLS Cup
 Winners (2): 2016, 2019
 Runners-up (2): 2017, 2020
Supporters' Shield
 Winners (1): 2014
 Runners-up (1): 2011
U.S. Open Cup
 Winners (4): 2009, 2010, 2011, 2014
 Runners-up (1): 2012

Continental competitions 
CONCACAF Champions League
 Winners (1): 2022
Leagues Cup
 Runners-up (1): 2021

Friendly trophies and other awards 
Cascadia Cup: 5
 2011, 2015, 2018, 2019, 2021
Heritage Cup: 8
 2010, 2011, 2013, 2016, 2017, 2018, 2019, 2021
Community Shield: 2
 2011, 2012
Desert Diamond Cup: 1
 2013
MLS Fair Play Award: 1
 2017
CCL Fair Play Award: 1
 2022

Player records

Goals scored 
Competitive, professional matches only.

As of Mar 5th, 2023

Assists 
MLS Competitive, professional matches only.
As of Mar 5th, 2023

Appearances

All statistics are correct .
 Youngest first-team player: Danny Leyva, 16 years old (v. Montreal Impact, Major League Soccer, June 5, 2019)

Oldest
All statistics are correct .
 Oldest first-team player: Kasey Keller, 41 years, 11 months, 8 days (v. Real Salt Lake, Major League Soccer, November 3, 2011)

Goalscorers

In a season
All statistics are correct .
 Most MLS goals in a season: 17, Obafemi Martins (2014)
Most all competition goals in a season: 19, Obafemi Martins (2014)
Most by a rookie in a season: 12, Jordan Morris (2016)

In a single match

All statistics are correct .
 Most goals in a single match:
3, Blaise Nkufo (v. Columbus Crew; Columbus Crew Stadium; September 18, 2010)
3, Lamar Neagle (v. Columbus Crew; CenturyLink Field; August 27, 2011)
3, David Estrada (soccer) (v. Toronto FC: CenturyLink Field; March 17, 2012)
3, Fredy Montero (v. Chivas USA: Home Depot Center; August 25, 2012)
3, Clint Dempsey (v. Portland Timbers: Providence Park; April 5, 2014)
3, Clint Dempsey (v. Orlando City SC: Camping World Stadium; August 7, 2016)
3, Jordan Morris (v. FC Dallas: CenturyLink Field; October 19, 2019)

Fastest
 Fastest recorded goal:
23 seconds, Clint Dempsey (v. San Jose Earthquakes, March 14, 2015)
45 seconds, Jordan Morris (v. LAFC, April 28th, 2019)
1:28 minute, Cristian Roldan (v. Colorado Rapids, October 3, 2021)
4 minutes, Blaise Nkufo (v. Columbus Crew, September 18, 2010)
4 minutes, Lamar Neagle (v. Columbus Crew, August 27, 2011)
4 minutes, Cristian Roldan (v. Portland Timbers, May 27, 2017)
4 minutes, Jordan Morris (v. San Jose Earthquakes, September 10, 2020)

 Fastest 2 goals: 1:01, Jordan Morris (v. Los Angeles FC, August 30, 2020)
 Fastest yellow card: 1 minute, Tyrone Marshall (v. Chicago Fire, May 2, 2009)
 Fastest red card: 7 minutes, Leonardo González (v. Columbus Crew, August 31, 2013)

In first appearance
In Major League Soccer:
Fredy Montero: against New York Red Bulls, March 19, 2009.
In International friendly:
Mike Seamon: against Boca Juniors, May 26, 2010.

International 
All statistics are correct .
 Most capped player: Clint Dempsey; for United States with 130 caps.
 Most international goals: Clint Dempsey; for United States with 57 goals.
 First player to appear in the World Cup: Kasey Keller; for the United States against Germany in Paris on June 15, 1998.
 Most World Cup appearances: Clint Dempsey; 10 (2 in 2006, 4 in 2010, 4 in 2014).
 First player to score in a World Cup: Freddie Ljungberg; on June 15, 2006 against Paraguay.
 Most recent player to appear in a World Cup: Gustav Svensson; on July 3, 2018 against Switzerland

Award winners 
MLS Best XI
The following players have been in the MLS Best XI while playing for the Seattle Sounders:
 Freddie Ljungberg – 2009
 Kasey Keller – 2011
 Osvaldo Alonso – 2012
 Chad Marshall – 2014, 2018
 Obafemi Martins – 2014
 Nicolás Lodeiro – 2020
 Jordan Morris – 2020
 Raúl Ruidíaz – 2020

MLS Player of the Month
The following players have been MLS Player of the Month while playing for the Seattle Sounders:
 Fredy Montero – March 2009
 Freddie Ljungberg – October 2009
 Fredy Montero – July 2010
 Clint Dempsey – April 2014
 Obafemi Martins - September 2014
 Nicolás Lodeiro –  August 2016
 Chad Marshall –  September 2016

MLS Goalkeeper of the Year
The following players have received the MLS Goalkeeper of the Year Award while playing for the Seattle Sounders:
 Kasey Keller – 2011

MLS Defender of the Year
The following players have received the MLS Defender of the Year Award while playing for the Seattle Sounders:
 Chad Marshall – 2014

MLS Comeback Player of the Year
The following players have received the MLS Comeback Player of the Year Award while playing for the Seattle Sounders:
 Eddie Johnson – 2012
 Clint Dempsey – 2017
 Jordan Morris – 2019

MLS Newcomer of the Year
The following players have received the MLS Newcomer of the Year Award while playing for the Seattle Sounders:
 Fredy Montero – 2009
 Mauro Rosales – 2011
 Nicolás Lodeiro – 2016

MLS Rookie of the Year
The following players have been MLS Rookie of the Year while playing for the Seattle Sounders:
 Jordan Morris – 2016

MLS Save of the Year
The following players have received the MLS Save of the Year Award while playing for the Seattle Sounders:
 Kasey Keller – 2010, 2011
 Stefan Frei – 2018, 2021

FutbolMLS.com Latino del Año
The following players have received the Latino del Año award while playing for the Seattle Sounders:

 Fredy Montero – 2010
 Marco Pappa – 2014
 Román Torres – 2016

Coaching records 
All statistics are correct .
First full-time coach: Sigi Schmid (coached the club for 194 league matches from March 2009 to July 2016).
Longest spell as coach: Sigi Schmid (coached the club for 194 league matches from March 2009 to July 2016).
First coach from outside the United States: Sigi Schmid (German – coached the club for 194 league matches from March 2009 to July 2016).
First coach to win an MLS Cup: Brian Schmetzer.

International competition (non MLS matches)

By opponent

Team records

Matches 
All statistics are correct .
First match: Los Angeles Galaxy 1–3 Seattle Sounders FC; Preseason; February 9, 2009.
First Major League Soccer match : Seattle Sounders FC 3–0 New York Red Bulls; Qwest Field; March 19, 2009.
First CONCACAF Champions League match: Seattle Sounders FC 1–0 Isidro Metapán; Qwest Field; July 28, 2010.
First Heritage Cup match: Seattle Sounders FC 2–1 San Jose Earthquakes, Qwest Field; June 13, 2009.
First MLS Cup Playoffs match: Seattle Sounders FC 0–0 Houston Dynamo; Qwest Field; October 29, 2009.
First Seattle Sounders FC Community Shield match: Seattle Sounders FC 0–1 Portland Timbers; March 11, 2010
First Cascadia Cup match: Seattle Sounders FC 1–1 Portland Timbers; Qwest Field; May 14, 2011
First World Football Challenge match: Seattle Sounders FC 2–4 Chelsea; CenturyLink Field; July 18, 2012.

Record wins 
All statistics are correct .
 Record win:
Seattle Sounders FC 7–0 UCF Knights; Preseason; February 11, 2009
 Record Major League Soccer win:
Seattle Sounders FC 7–1 San Jose Earthquakes; CenturyLink Field; September 10, 2020
 Record U.S. Open Cup win:
Seattle Sounders FC 6–0 Chicago Fire; Starfire Sports Complex; August 13, 2014
 Record CONCACAF Champions League win:
Seattle Sounders FC 4–0 Santa Tecla; CenturyLink Field; March 1, 2018

Record losses 
All statistics are correct .
 Record loss:
Seattle Sounders FC 1–6 Santos Laguna; CONCACAF Champions League; March 11, 2012
 Record Major League Soccer loss:
Seattle Sounders FC 0–5 New England Revolution; Gillette Stadium; May 11, 2014
 Record CONCACAF Champions League loss:
Seattle Sounders FC 1–6 Santos Laguna; CONCACAF Champions League; March 11, 2012

References 

records and statistics
Seattle Sounders FC